Pavla Hamáčková married Rybová (born 20 May 1978 in Chomutov) is a Czech pole vaulter.

Biography
She finished 11th place overall in the final of the 2004 Summer Olympics pole vault competition.

In 2001, she won the IAAF World Indoor Championships gold medal after securing a new games record of 4.56 metres.

In 2005, she won bronze at the World Championships in Finland.

Pavla Hamáčková married decathlete Jiří Ryba in 2006. On 14 February 2007 she improved Czech record to 464 cm in Bydgoszcz, Poland, only to be overcome just two hours later by Kateřina Baďurová's 465 cm in Prague, Czech Republic.

References 

1978 births
Living people
Sportspeople from Chomutov
Czech female pole vaulters
Athletes (track and field) at the 2000 Summer Olympics
Athletes (track and field) at the 2004 Summer Olympics
Olympic athletes of the Czech Republic
World Athletics Championships medalists
Universiade medalists in athletics (track and field)
Universiade gold medalists for the Czech Republic
World Athletics Indoor Championships winners
Medalists at the 1999 Summer Universiade